Marlo Anderson is a technology talk show host, entrepreneur and the founder of National Day Calendar.

Career

In 1999, Anderson, along with partner Nicholas Ressler, formed Awesome 2 Productions in Mandan, ND. In 2007, the two developed a new company called Zoovio, which transcodes video tape to a digital format which is stored in a private, online vault, and can be played back on any smart device and connected television.

In Jan 2013, Anderson  started the radio talk show known as "The Tech Ranch".  In addition to the weekly talk show, The Tech Ranch covers events such as CES. Anderson also contributes to regional and national news stories in the technology space.

On January 19, 2013, Anderson founded the National Day Calendar.

Anderson is also an advocate for autonomous vehicles and the Autonomous Friendly Corridor.

References

Living people
1962 births
American technology company founders
American talk radio hosts
People from Mandan, North Dakota